The 2015 Men's European Individual Closed Championships is the men's edition of the 2015 European Squash Individual Championships, which serves as the individual European championship for squash players. The event took place in Bratislava in Slovakia from 27 to 30 May 2015. Grégory Gaultier won his ninth European Individual Championships title, defeating Borja Golán in the final.

Seeds

Draw and results

Finals

See also
2015 Women's European Individual Closed Championships
European Squash Individual Championships

References

External links
European Squash Championships 2015 official website

2015 in squash
Squash in Europe
Sports competitions in Bratislava
2015 in Slovak sport
2010s in Bratislava
Squash tournaments in Slovakia
International sports competitions hosted by Slovakia
May 2015 sports events in Europe